Guillermo Viscarra Bruckner (born February 7, 1993) is a Bolivian  footballer who plays goalkeeper for The Strongest.

Club career statistics

References

External links
 

1993 births
Living people
Bolivian footballers
Esporte Clube Vitória players
Club Bolívar players
C.D. Jorge Wilstermann players
Oriente Petrolero players
Hapoel Ra'anana A.F.C. players
Israeli Premier League players
Bolivian Primera División players
Bolivian expatriate footballers
Expatriate footballers in Brazil
Expatriate footballers in Israel
Bolivian expatriate sportspeople in Brazil
Sportspeople from Santa Cruz de la Sierra
Association football goalkeepers